Kateřina Siniaková and Renata Voráčová were the defending champions, but they chose not to participate this year.
Barbora Krejčíková and Mandy Minella won the title, defeating Margarita Gasparyan and Oksana Kalashnikova in the final 1–6, 7–5, [10–6].

Seeds

Draw

Draw

External Links
 Draw

Open de Limoges - Doubles
Open de Limoges